Matthew Vollmer is an American writer, editor, and professor at Virginia Tech.

Life 
Vollmer was born on May 25, 1974 in Andrews, North Carolina, where he was raised. He graduated with a BA in English from the University of North Carolina at Chapel Hill in 1996. He holds an MA in English from North Carolina State University, which he received in 1998, and an MFA in fiction from the Iowa Writers’ Workshop, which he received in 2006. Vollmer currently teaches at Virginia Tech as an Associate Professor of English.

Works 
Vollmer is the author of four books. His most recent is Permanent Exhibit, a collection of short prose pieces which existed originally as social media status updates. He co-edited Fakes: An Anthology of Pseudo Interviews, Faux-Lectures, Quasi-Letters, “Found” Texts, and Other Fraudulent Artifacts and is the editor of A Book of Uncommon Prayer.

Vollmer's work has also been published widely in magazines, including Paris Review, Glimmer Train, The Sun, Virginia Quarterly Review, Epoch, Tin House, the Oxford American, Colorado Review, Gulf Coast, Ecotone, Hayden’s Ferry Review, The Antioch Review, Willow Springs, DIAGRAM, Portland Review, Tampa Review, Passages North, PANK, New England Review, The Normal School, Confrontation, Salt Hill, Fugue, PRISM International, and New Letters.

Bibliography

Books 
 Future Missionaries of America, MacAdam/Cage; (2009) , Salt Modern Fiction; (2010) 
 Inscriptions for Headstones, Outpost 19; (2012) 
 Gateway to Paradise, Persea Books; (2015) 
 Permanent Exhibit, BOA Editions Ltd.; (2018)

Edited works 
 Fakes: An Anthology of Pseudo-Interview, Faux-Lectures, Quasi-Letters, “Found” Texts, and Other Fraudulent Artifacts, edited by David Shields and Matthew Vollmer, W. W. Norton; (2012) 
 A Book of Uncommon Prayer, Outpost19; (2015)

Awards and honors 
 2010 National Endowment for the Arts Fellowship
 2013 Best American Essays
 2015 Pushcart Prize

References

External links 
 Author website
 National Endowment for the Arts page
 Virginia Tech Faculty page

1974 births
21st-century American writers
21st-century American novelists
Writers from North Carolina
University of North Carolina alumni
North Carolina State University alumni
Iowa Writers' Workshop alumni
Virginia Tech faculty
Living people